A Billion Heartbeats is the sixth studio album by English indie rock band Mystery Jets. It was released on 3 April 2020.

Background 
The first single released from the album was "Hospital Radio" on 8 July 2019, and it was first played on Steve Lamacq's BBC Radio 6 Music show. The next single, "Screwdriver", was released on the 5 August 2019, alongside the announcement of the album name, tour dates and release date of 27 September 2019.

On 17 September 2019, the band announced the postponement of the album's release and tour due to the hospitalisation of singer Blaine Harrison. They announced the rescheduled album release date for the 3 April 2020, with the tour following in April–May.

The band were forced to reschedule the tour again to November–December 2020, due to the coronavirus pandemic, however the album release still went ahead as planned, but only digitally.

As a result of the postponed release, two EPs were released - Petty Drone and A Billion Heartbeats, each having all the released tracks up to that point.

Critical reception 

A Billion Heartbeats received positive reviews from contemporary music critics. At Metacritic, which assigns a normalised rating out of 100 to reviews from mainstream critics, the album received an average score of 87, based on seven reviews, indicating "universal acclaim".

Most critics were impressed with the rousing sound displayed on the record; Neil McCormick of The Daily Telegraph praised the anthemic and intention sound of the album, stating that: "This is the sound of a group breaking out of their shell and demanding to be heard." DIY Magazine reviewer Elly Watson agreed, calling the album a "rallying call for change and action", whilst also positing that the record will become an "undoubtedly influential album."  Alice Jenner of The Line of Best Fit echoed these calls, suggesting that "it's not a far stretch from their already established sound" but retains a sound which is "slightly heavier and a bit more raw in places"

Track listing

Personnel 
Mystery Jets

Blaine Harrison – vocals, keyboards, guitar
 Kapil Trivedi – drums
 Henry Harrison – keyboards, guitar
 Jack Flanagan – bass
 William Rees – guitar, vocals

Charts

References 

Mystery Jets albums
2020 albums
Caroline Distribution albums